The 2023 National Premier Leagues is the eleventh season of the Australian National Premier Leagues football competition. The league competition is being played by eight separate state and territory member federations. The divisions are ACT, NSW, Northern NSW, Queensland, South Australia, Tasmania, Victoria and Western Australia. The winners of each respective divisional league will compete in a finals series tournament at season end, culminating in a Grand Final.

League Tables

Australian Capital Territory

New South Wales

Football NSW have re-organised the leagues for the 2023 season, reducing the number of leagues from four to three while increasing their size to 16 teams. In the prior season there was no relegation, with four teams promoted from League One to the NPL competition.

Northern New South Wales

Queensland

South Australia

Tasmania

Victoria

Western Australia

Final series

References

External links
 Official website

2023
2023 domestic association football leagues
2023 in Australian soccer